Jambalyn Ganbold (born 6 September 1959) is a Mongolian judoka. He competed at the 1988 Summer Olympics and the 1992 Summer Olympics.

References

1959 births
Living people
Mongolian male judoka
Olympic judoka of Mongolia
Judoka at the 1988 Summer Olympics
Judoka at the 1992 Summer Olympics
People from Uvs Province
Competitors at the 1986 Goodwill Games
Goodwill Games medalists in judo
Judoka at the 1998 Asian Games